Art Lande is an American musician who was born in New York City, United States, on 5 February 1947.

Born in New York, Lande began piano at age 4. He attended Williams College and moved to San Francisco in 1969. In 1973 he recorded Red Lanta, an album of duets with Norwegian musician Jan Garbarek. With Mark Isham on trumpet, he started the Rubisa Patrol group in 1976. They performed in the Bay Area and toured extensively in Europe by van. This group made two records for ECM: Rubisa Patrol (1976), Desert Marauders (1977), and one for 1750 Arch Records, The Story of Ba-Ku (1978).

In the early 1980s Lande taught at the Cornish College of the Arts in Seattle. He moved to Switzerland, where he taught at a jazz school in St. Gallen. In 1987 he moved to Boulder, Colorado to teach at Naropa University.

Lande has written many compositions, but is also known for his unusual and distinctive interpretations of popular and jazz standards. He has made several solo piano recordings devoted to such material, including The Eccentricities of Earl Dant in 1977, Hardball! (1987), Melissa Spins Away (1987), Friday the Thirteenth (1996, featuring thirteen Thelonious Monk compositions) and While She Sleeps (2005).

Although he is known as a pianist, Lande has performed and recorded on drums.

Discography

As leader/co-leader

Main source:

As sideman
With Gary Peacock
 Shift in the Wind (ECM, 1980)

With Paul McCandless
 All the Mornings Bring (Elektra/Asylum, 1979)
 Heresay (Windham Hill, 1988)
 The Tale of Peter Rabbit, The Tale of Mr. Jeremy Fisher, and The Tale of Two Bad Mice, with Meryl Streep, narration (Windham Hill/Rabbit Ears, 1987)

With  Maurizio Giammarco 
 Love Ballads  (Red Records, 1986)

Positions
Private Instructor, SF & Berkeley CA (1970–1977)
Lone Mountain College, San Francisco (1978–1979)
Cornish College of the Arts, Seattle (1979–1983)
San Jose State College, San Jose, California (1983–1984)
Jazz School of Migros Klubschule, St. Gallen, Switzerland (1984–1987)
Jazz School Lausanne, Switzerland (1986–1987)
Naropa Institute, Boulder, Colorado (1987–1999)
University of Colorado, Boulder, Colorado (2006–Present)

References

External links
 Official site
 short film portrait on Art Lande (2020), shot in Boulder, CO, in 2019

Avant-garde jazz musicians
1947 births
Living people
University of San Francisco faculty
American jazz pianists
American male pianists
Jewish American musicians
ECM Records artists
Cornish College of the Arts faculty
Blue Coast Records artists
Jewish jazz musicians
20th-century American pianists
21st-century American pianists
20th-century American male musicians
21st-century American male musicians
American male jazz musicians
Williams College alumni
American expatriates in Switzerland
21st-century American Jews